This page is a list of South American saints, blesseds, venerables, and Servants of God, as recognized by the Roman Catholic Church. These people were born, died, or lived their religious life in any of the territories of  South America with the exception of Brazil, which has its own page.

The Catholic Church entered South America in 1500 through Brazil and quickly expanded across the continent with the Spanish and Portuguese cultures.  Today this area remains heavily Catholic.

List of saints

The following is the list of saints, including the year in which they were canonized and the country or countries with which they are associated.
 St. Louis Bertrand  (1526–1581), Dominican priest (Colombia)
Declared Venerable: N/A
Beatified: 19 July 1608 by Pope Paul V
Canonized: 12 April 1671 by Pope Clement X
 St. Rose of Lima (1586–1617), lay Dominican (Peru)
Declared Venerable: N/A
Beatified: 15 April 1668 by Pope Clement IX
Canonized: 12 April 1671 by Pope Clement X
 St. Turibius of Mongrovejo (1538–1606), secular Archbishop (Peru)
Declared Venerable: N/A
Beatified: 2 July 1679 by Pope Innocent XI
Canonized: 10 December 1726 by Pope Benedict XIII
 St. Francis Solanus (1549–1610), Franciscan priest (Peru)
Declared Venerable: N/A
Beatified: 20 June 1675 by Pope Clement X
Canonized: 27 December 1726 by Pope Benedict XIII
 St. Peter Claver (1580–1654), Jesuit priest (Colombia)
Declared Venerable: N/A
Beatified: 21 September 1851 by Pope Pius IX
Canonized: 15 January 1888 by Pope Leo XIII
 St. Mariana de Jesús de Paredes (1618–1645), secular Franciscan (Ecuador)
Declared Venerable: 19 March 1776
Beatified: 20 November 1853 by Pope Pius IX
Canonized: 9 July 1950 by Pope Pius XII
 St. Martin de Porres (1579–1639), Dominican brother (Peru)
Declared Venerable: N/A
Beatified: 29 October 1837 by Pope Gregory XVI
Canonized: 6 May 1962 by Pope John XXIII
 St. John Macias (1585–1645), Dominican brother (Peru)
Declared Venerable: 2 February 1762
Beatified: 22 October 1837 by Pope Gregory XVI
Canonized: 28 September 1975 by Pope Paul VI
 St. Miguel Febres Cordero (1854–1910), De La Salle Brother (Ecuador)
Declared Venerable: 16 March 1970
Beatified: 30 October 1977 by Pope Paul VI
Canonized: 21 October 1984 by Pope John Paul II
 St. Roque González de Santa Cruz, Juan del Castillo, and Alfonso Rodríguez Olmedo (d. 1628), Jesuits (Paraguay and Peru)
Declared Martyrdom: 3 December 1933
Beatified: 28 January 1934 by Pope Pius XI
Canonized: 16 May 1988 by Pope John Paul II
 St. Ezequiel Moreno y Díaz (1848–1906), Augustinian Recollect (Colombia)
Declared Venerable: 1 February 1975
Beatified: 1 November 1975 by Pope Paul VI
Canonized: 11 October 1992 by Pope John Paul II
 St. Teresa of Los Andes (1900–1920), Discalced Carmelite (Chile)
Declared Venerable: 22 March 1986 
Beatified: 3 April 1987 by Pope John Paul II
Canonized: 21 March 1993 by Pope John Paul II
 St. Benito de Jesus (born Hector Valdivielso Saez) (1910–1934), De La Salle Brother and Martyr in Spain (Argentina)
Declared Martyrdom: 7 September 1989
Beatified: 29 April 1990 by Pope John Paul II
Canonized: 21 November 1999 by Pope John Paul II
 St. Alberto Hurtado (1901–1952), Jesuit priest (Chile)
Declared Venerable: 21 December 1991
Beatified: 16 October 1994 by Pope John Paul II
Canonized: 23 October 2005 by Pope Benedict XVI
 St. Maria Bernarda Bütler (1848–1924), foundress, Franciscan Missionary Sisters of Mary Help of Christians (Colombia and Ecuador)
Declared Venerable: 21 December 1991
Beatified: 29 October 1995 by Pope John Paul II
Canonized: 12 October 2008 by Pope Benedict XVI
 St. Narcisa de Jesús (1832–1869), layperson (Ecuador and Peru)
Declared Venerable: 23 October 1987 
Beatified: 25 October 1992 by Pope John Paul II
Canonized: 12 October 2008 by Pope Benedict XVI
 St. Laura of Saint Catherine of Siena (1874–1949), foundress,  Missionary Sisters of Mary Immaculate and St. Catherine of Siena (Colombia)
Declared Venerable: 22 January 1991 
Beatified: 25 April 2004 by Pope John Paul II
Canonized: 12 May 2013 by Pope Francis
 St. Jose Gabriel del Rosario Brochero (1840–1914), secular priest (Argentina)
Declared Venerable: 19 April 2004
Beatified: 14 September 2013 by Cardinal Angelo Amato
Canonized: 16 October 2016 by Pope Francis
 St. Ignacia Nazaria March Mesa (1889–1943), foundress, Missionary Crusaders of the Church (Argentina and Bolivia)
Declared Venerable: 1 September 1988 
Beatified: 27 September 1992 by Pope John Paul II
Canonized: 14 October 2018 by Pope Francis
 St. Francesca Maria Rubatto (1844–1904), foundress, Capuchin Sisters of Mother Rubatto (Uruguay)
Declared Venerable: 1 September 1988
Beatified: 10 October 1993 by Pope John Paul II
Canonized: 15 May 2022 by Pope Francis
 St. Artémides Zatti (1880–1951), Salesian religious (Argentina)
Declared Venerable: 7 July 1997 
Beatified: 14 April 2002 by Pope John Paul II
Canonized: 9 October 2022 by Pope Francis

List of blesseds
 Bl. Peter Donders (1809–1887), Redemptorist priest (Suriname)
Declared Venerable: 25 March 1945 
Beatified: 23 May 1982 by Pope John Paul II
 Bl. Mercedes de Jesús Molina (1828–1883), foundress, Marianitas Sisters (Ecuador)
Declared Venerable: 27 November 1981 
Beatified: 1 February 1985 by Pope John Paul II
 Bl. Ana de los Angeles Monteagudo (1602–1686), Dominican nun (Peru)
Declared Venerable: 23 May 1975
Beatified: 2 February 1985 by Pope John Paul II
 Bl. Laura Vicuña (1891–1904), child (Argentina and Chile)
Declared Venerable: 5 June 1986
Beatified: 3 September 1988 by Pope John Paul II
 Bl. Arturo Ayala Niño and 6 Hospitallers of Saint John of God and martyrs in Spain (d. 1936) (Colombia)
Declared Martyrdom: 14 May 1991
Beatified: 25 October 1992 by Pope John Paul II
 Bl. Laura Evangelista Alvarado Cardozo (1875–1967), Recollect nun (Venezuela)
Declared Venerable: 7 March 1992 
Beatified: 7 May 1995 by Pope John Paul II
 Bl. Maria Vicenta Rosal (1815–1886), religious, Bethlemite Sisters, Daughters of the Sacred Heart of Jesus (Colombia and Ecuador)
Declared Venerable: 6 April 1995
Beatified: 4 May 1997 by Pope John Paul II
 Bl. Mariano de Jesús Euse Hoyos (1845–1926), diocesan priest (Colombia)
Declared Venerable: 3 March 1990
Beatified: 9 April 2000 by Pope John Paul II
 Bb. Maria of Jesus, Consuelo Aguiar-Mella Diaz and Maria Dolores Aguiar-Mella Diaz, Escolapia sister and two laywomen, Martyrs in Spain (d. 1936) (Uruguay)
Declared Martyrdom: 28 June 1999
Beatified: 11 March 2001 by Pope John Paul II
 Bl. Luigi Tezza (1841–1923), Camillian priest (Peru)
Declared Venerable: 24 April 2001
Beatified: 4 November 2001 by Pope John Paul II
 Bl. Luigi Variara (1875–1923), Salesian priest (Colombia)
Declared Venerable: 2 April 1993
Beatified: 14 April 2002 by Pope John Paul II
 Bl. María del Tránsito Cabanillas (1821–1885), foundress, Franciscan Tertiary Missionary Sisters (Argentina)
Declared Venerable: 28 June 1999 
Beatified: 14 April 2002 by Pope John Paul II
 Bl. Maria Josefa Karolina Brader (1860–1943), foundress, Franciscan Sisters of Mary Immaculate (Colombia and Ecuador)
Declared Venerable: 28 June 1999 
Beatified: 23 March 2003 by Pope John Paul II
 Bl. María Ludovica de Angelis (1880–1962), religious, Daughters of Our Lady of Mercy (Argentina)
Declared Venerable: 20 December 2001
Beatified: 3 October 2004 by Pope John Paul II
 Bl. Ceferino Namuncurá (1886–1905), child (Argentina)
Declared Venerable: 22 June 1972
Beatified: 11 November 2007 by Cardinal José Saraiva Martins
 Bl. Candlemas of San José (1863–1940), foundress, Hermanas Carmelitas de Madre Candelaria (Venezuela)
Declared Venerable: 19 April 2004
Beatified: 27 April 2008 by Cardinal José Saraiva Martins
 Bl. María Angélica Pérez (1897–1932), religious, Daughters of Our Lady of the Garden (Argentina and Chile)
Declared Venerable: 22 June 2004
Beatified: 17 November 2012 by Cardinal Angelo Amato
 Bl. Maria Troncatti (1883–1969), Salesian sister (Ecuador)
Declared Venerable: 12 November 2008
Beatified: 24 November 2012 by Cardinal Angelo Amato
 Bl. Jesus Anibal Gomez y Gomez (1913–1936), Claretian and martyr in Spain (Colombia)
Declared Martyrdom: 1 July 2010
Beatified: 13 October 2013 by Cardinal Angelo Amato
 The Three Martyrs of Chimbote (Peru)
Michał Tomaszek (1960–1991), priest of Chimbote (Peru)
Zbigniew Adam Strzałkowski (1958–1991), priest of Chimbote (Peru)
Alessandro Dordi (1931–1991), priest of Chimbote (Peru)
Declared Martyrdom: 3 February 2015
Beatified: 5 December 2015 by Cardinal Angelo Amato
 Bl. María Antonia de Paz y Figueroa  (1730–1799), founderess, Daughters of the Divine Savior (Argentina)
Declared Venerable:  1 July 2010 
Beatified: 27 August 2016 by Cardinal Angelo Amato
 Bl. Jesús Emilio Jaramillo Monsalve (1916–1989),  Bishop of Arauca, a professed member of the Xaverian Missionaries of Yarumal and martyr (Colombia)
Declared Martyrdom: 7 July 2017
Beatified: 8 September 2017 by Pope Francis
 Bl. Pedro María Ramírez Ramos (1899–1948), diocesan priest and martyr (Colombia)
Declared Martyrdom: 7 July 2017
Beatified:  8 September 2017 by Pope Francis
 Bl. Saturnina Rodríguez de Zavalía (Catalina of Mary) (1823–1896), founderess, Handmaids of the Heart of Jesus (Argentina)
Declared Venerable: 18 December 1997
Beatified: 25 November 2017 by Cardinal Angelo Amato
 Bl. Carmen Elena Rendiles Martínez (1903–1977), foundress, Servants of Jesus of Caracas (Venezuela)
Declared Venerable: 5 July 2013
Beatified: 16 June 2018 by Cardinal Angelo Amato
 Bl. María Guggiari Echeverría (1925–1959), Discalced Carmelite (Paraguay)
Declared Venerable: 27 March 2010
Beatified: 23 June 2018 by Cardinal Angelo Amato
The Martyrs of La Rioja
Carlos de Dios Murias (1945–1976), priest of La Rioja (Argentina)
Gabriel Longueville (1931–1976), priest of La Rioja (Argentina)
Wenceslao Pedernera (1936–1976), layman of La Rioja (Argentina)
Declared Martyrdom: 8 June 2018 
Beatified: 27 April 2019 by Cardinal Giovanni Angelo Becciu
 Bl. Enrique Angelelli (1923–1976), Bishop of La Rioja, (Argentina) 
Declared Martyrdom: 8 June 2018
Beatified: 27 April 2019 by Cardinal Giovanni Angelo Becciu
 Bl. Victor Emilio Moscoso Cárdenas (1846–1897), professed priest, Jesuits (Ecuador)
Declared Martyrdom: 12 February 2019
Beatified: 16 November 2019 by Cardinal Giovanni Angelo Becciu
 Bl. José Gregorio Hernández (1864–1919), layman (Venezuela)
Declared Venerable: 16 January 1986
Beatified: 30 April 2021 by Archbishop Aldo Giordano
 Bl. Mamerto Esquiú (1826–1883), Franciscan friar (Argentina)
Declared Venerable: 16 December 2006
Beatified: 4 September 2021 by Cardinal Luis Héctor Villalba
 Bl. Antonia Luzmila Rivas López (María Augustina) (1920-1990), Professed Religious of the Religious of the Good Shepherd; Martyr (Peru)
Declared Martyr: 22 May 2021
Beatified: 7 May 2022 by Cardinal Baltazar Enrique Porras Cardozo
 The Martyrs of Zenta
 Pedro Ortiz de Zàrate (1622–1683), priest of the Diocese of Orán (Argentina)
 Giovanni Antonio Solinas (1643–1683),  professed priest of the Society of Jesus (Argentina)
Declared Martyrdom: 13 October 2021
Beatified: 2 July 2022 by Cardinal Marcello Semeraro
 Bl. Maria Berenice Duque Hencker (1898–1993), foundress of the Little Sisters of the Annunciation, (Colombia)
Declared Venerable: 12 February 2019
Beatified: 29 October 2022 by Cardinal Marcello Semeraro

List of venerables
 Ven. Francisco Camacho (1629–1698), Hospitaller of Saint John of God (Peru)
Declared Venerable: 1 January 1881
 Ven. Pedro Urraca (1583–1657), Mercedarian priest (Peru and Ecuador)
Declared Venerable: 31 January 1981
 Ven. Dorotea de Chopitea (1816–1891), lay Salesian (Chile)
Declared Venerable: 9 June 1983
 Ven. Mariano Avellana Lasierra (1844–1904), Claretian priest (Chile)
Declared Venerable: 23 October 1987
 Ven. Vicente Albistur (1562–1619), Dominican priest (Bolivia)
Declared Venerable: 22 January 1991
 Ven. Camila Rolón (1842–1913),  foundress, Poor Sisters of Saint Joseph of Buenos Aires (Argentina)
Declared Venerable: 2 April 1993
 Ven. Emilia de San Jose Chapellin (1858–1893), foundress, Little Sisters of the Poor of Maiquetía (Venezuela)
Declared Venerable: 23 December 1993
 Ven. Isabel Tejada Cuartas (1887–1925), religious, Missionary Sisters of Mary Immaculate and Saint Catherine of Siena (Colombia)
Declared Venerable: 26 March 1994
 Ven. Jose Leon Torres (1849–1930), Mercedarian priest (Argentina)
Declared Venerable:  26 March 1994
 Ven. Julio Matovelle (1852–1929), secular priest and founder, Missionary Oblates of Sacred Hearts of Jesus and Mary (Ecuador)
Declared Venerable: 26 March 1994
 Ven. Teresa of the Cross Alvarez-Calderon (1875–1953), foundress, Canonesses of the Cross (Peru)
Declared Venerable: 3 April 2009
 Ven. Marcelina de San Jose Aveledo y Aveledo (1874–1959), foundress, Sisters of the Poor of Saint Peter Claver (Colombia and Venezuela)
Declared Venerable: 20 December 2012
 Ven. Rosa Elena Cornejo Pazmiño (1874–1964), founderess, Franciscan Missionaries of the Immaculata (Ecuador)
Declared Venerable: 20 December 2012
 Ven. Clemens Fuhl (1874–1935), Augustinian priest (Bolivia) 
Declared Venerable: 9 December 2013
 Ven. Maria Benita Arias (1822–1894), foundress, Sisters Servants of Jesus in the Sacrament (Argentina)
Declared Venerable: 27 January 2014
 Ven. Francisco Valdés Subercaseaux (1908–1982), Capuchin Bishop (Chile)
Declared Venerable: 7 November 2014
 Ven. Virginia Blanco Tardío (1916–1990), laywoman (Bolivia)
Declared Venerable: 22 January 2015
 Ven. Jacinto Vera (1813–1881), Bishop of Montevideo (Uruguay)
Declared Venerable: 5 May 2015
 Ven. Rafaél Manuel Almansa Riaño (1840–1927), priest (Colombia)
Declared Venerable: 9 May 2016
 Ven. Isidoro Zorzano Ledesma (1902–1943), member of Opus Dei (Argentina)
Declared Venerable: 21 December 2016
 Ven. Octavio Ortiz Arrieta (1879–1958), Bishop of Chachapoyas (Peru)
Declared Venerable: 27 February 2017
 Ven. Isora María del Tránsito Ocampo (1841–1900), religious of the Carmelite Sisters of Charity (Argentina)
Declared Venerable: 19 May 2018
 Ven. Miguel Ángel Builes (1888–1971), Bishop of Santa Rosa de Osos (Colombia)
Declared Venerable: 19 May 2018
 Ven. Raffaella Veintemilla Villacís (1836–1918), foundress of the Congregation of the Augustinian Daughters of the Most Holy Saviour, (Ecuador), (Peru)
Declared Venerable: 7 November 2018
Ven. Enrique Ernesto Shaw (1921–1962), businessman, (Argentina)
Declared Venerable: 24 April 2021
 Ven. Eduardo Francisco Pironio (1920–1998) Cardinal-Bishop of Sabina-Porto Mirteto, (Argentina)
Declared Venerable: 18 February 2022
Ven. Martin Fulgencio Elorza Legaristi (1899–1966), bishop of the territorial prelature of Moyobamba (Peru)
Declared Venerable: 5 August 2022
 Ven. Jesús Antonio Gómez Gómez (1895–1971) Diocesan priest (Colombia)
Declared Venerable: 5 August 2022
Ven. José Marcos Figueroa (1865–1942) Jesuits priest (Argentina)
Declared Venerable: 17 December 2022

 Ven. Nicolás Ayllón (1632–1677), layman (Peru)
Declared Venerable: N/A
 Ven. Peter Bardesio, lay Franciscan (Chile)
Declared Venerable: N/A

In addition, Habig refers to Paul Emilian Reynaud, a Franciscan priest martyred in 1862 in Bolivia, of whom he says the "title of 'Venerable' has, it seems, been bestowed on him popularly, not officially."

List of Servants of God

 Servant of God Luigi Bolla [Luigi Bolla Sartori] (Yankuam' Jintia) (1932-2013), Professed Priest of the Salesians of Don Bosco (Peru)
 Servant of God Julio César Duarte Ortellado (1906–1943), secular priest (Argentina and Paraguay)
 Servant of God Ysabel Lagrange (1855–1933), foundress, Franciscan Sisters of the Sacred Heart of Jesus (Venezuela)
 Servant of God Miguel Antonio Salas Salas (1915–2003), Eudist Archbishop (Venezuela)
 Servant of God Mariana de Jesus Torres (1563–1635), Conceptionist nun and visionary of Our Lady of Good Success (Ecuador)
 Servant of God Maria Esperanza de Bianchini (1928–2004), Mystic and received the stigmata and Marian Appraritions (Venezuela)
 Servant of God Joseph Walijewski (1924–2006), secular priest (Diocese of La Crosse, WI, USA) (Peru and Bolivia)
 Servant of God Guillermo Muzzio (1972-2002), Seminarian of the Diocese of San Miguel (Argentina)
 Servant of God José Antonio Sarasola Uruláin (Barnabé of Larraul) (1907-1998), Professed Priest of the Franciscan Capuchins (Ecuador)
 Servant of God Adela Sesso (Maria Benedetta of the Immaculate) (1918-2001), Professed Religious of the Poor Sisters of Saint Joseph of Buenos Aires (Argentina)
 Servant of God Amanda Gilseth Ruiz Suarez [Amandita] (1999-2005), Child of the Archdiocese of San Cristobal de Venezuela (Venezuela)
 Servant of God Salvador García Pintos (1891-1956), Married Layperson of the Archdiocese of Montevideo (Uruguay)
 Servant of God Mercedes Reyes Sánchez (Mercedes of Saint Therese) (1930-2012), Professed Religious of the Discalced Carmelite Nuns (Colombia)
 Servant of God Lucio Leon Cardenas (1913-2010), Married Layperson of the Archdiocese of San Cristobal de Venezuela (Venezuela)
 Servant of God Pedro Manuel Salado de Alba (1968–2012), Layperson of the Diocese of Esmeraldas; Member of the Ecclesial Family "Hogar de Nazaret" (Ecuador)
 Servant of God Jorge Novak (1928–2001), Professed Priest of the Society of the Divine Word; Bishop of Quilmes (Argentina)
 Servant of God Jose Cappel Farfsing [Joseph Henry Cappel] (1908–2004), Priest of the Maryknoll Missionary Society (Chile)
 Servant of God Margarita Fonseca Silvestre (1884–1945), Founder of the Servants of Christ the Priest (Colombia)
 Servant of God Federico (Friedrich) Grote (1853–1940), Professed Priest of the Redemptorists (Argentina)
 Servant of God Manuel (prob. 1604–1686), Layperson of the Archdiocese of Mercedes-Luján (Argentina)
 Servant of God Jorge Maria (Georges) Salvaire (1847–1899), Priest of the Congregation of the Mission (Vincentians) (Argentina)
 Servant of God Alonzo de Barzana (ca. 1530–1597), Professed Priest of the Jesuits (Peru)
 Servant of God Andrea Aziani [Andres Aziani Samek-Lodovici] (1953–2008), Layperson of the Diocese of Carabayllo; Member of the Memores Domini Lay Association (Peru)
 Servant of God Pablo Muñoz Vega (1903–1994), Professed Priest of the Jesuits; Archbishop of Quito; Cardinal (Ecuador)
 Servant of God Hernán Alessandri Morandé (1935–2007), Professed Priest of the Secular Institute of the Schoenstatt Fathers (Chile)
 Servant of God Fermín Emilio Lobo (Antonio of Jesus) (1873–1942), Professed Priest of the Franciscan Friars Minor (Argentina)
 Servant of God Reginaldo Toro (1830–1904), Professed Priest of the Dominicans; Bishop of Cordoba; Founder of the Dominican Tertiary Sisters of Saint Joseph (Argentina)
 Servant of God Joaquín Carlos Paredes Pérez (Jesús of the Cross) (1911–1998), Professed Religious of the Franciscan Friars Minor (Argentina)
 Servant of God Juan Ignacio Larrea Holguín (1927–2006), Priest of the Personal Prelature of the Holy Cross and Opus Dei; Archbishop of Guayaquil (Argentina-Ecuador)
 Servant of God Adolfo Rodriguez Vidal (1920–2003), Priest of the Personal Prelature of the Holy Cross and Opus Dei; Bishop of Santa Maria de Los Ángeles (Chile)
 Servant of God Mario Pantaleo (1915–1992), priest of the archdiocese of Buenos Aires; faith healer and mystic (Argentina)
 Servant of God Daniel Badiali Massironi (1962–1997), priest of the diocese of Faenza-Modigliana; Fidei Donum missionary in the diocese of Huari (Peru)
 Servant of God Ramón Zubieta Les (1864–1921), bishop of Puerto Maldonado; cofounder, Missionary Dominican Sisters of the Rosary (Peru)
 Servant of God Emilio Lissón Chávez (1872–1961), priest of the Congregation of the Mission (Vincentians) (Peru)
 Servant of God John Joseph Mckniff (1872–1994), professed priest, Augustinians (Peru)
 Servant of God Diego Ruiz Ortiz (1532–1571), professed priest, Augustinians (Peru)
 Servant of God Luis López de Solís (1535–1606), bishop of Quito, Augustinians (Peru)
 Servant of God Rosa Mercedes de Castañeda Coello (1856–1950), founder, Religious Reparatrices of the Sacred Heart (Peru)
 Servant of God Francisco Tito Yupanqui (1540-1616), layperson of the diocese of El Alto (Peru)
 Servant of God Serapio Rivero Nicolás (1917-2002), professed priest, Augustinians (Peru)
 Servant of God Enrique Pèlach Feliu (1917-2007), bishop of Abancay (Peru)
 Servant of God José Álvarez Fernández (1890-1970), professed priest, Dominicans (Peru)
 Servant of God Friedrich Kaiser Depel (1903-1993), bishop of Caravelí (Peru)
 Servant of God Alfonso María De La Cruz Sardinas Zavala (1842-1902), professed priest, Franciscan Friars Minor (Peru)
 Servant of God Melchora Saravia Tasayco (1895-1951), layperson of the diocese of Ica, Secular Franciscans (Peru)
 Servant of God María Josefa Camila Del Carmen Álvarez Salas (1860-1924), founder, Franciscan Sisters of the Immaculate Conception (Peru)
 Servant of God Pío Sarobe Otaño (1855-1910), professed priest, Franciscan Friars Minor (Peru)
 Servant of God Francisco del Castillo (1615-1673), professed priest, Jesuits (Peru)
 Servant of God Juan de Alloza Menacho (1597-1666), professed priest, Jesuits (Peru)
 Servant of God Luisa De La Torre Rojas (1819-1869), layperson of the archdiocese of Lima (Peru)
 Servant of God Nicolás De Dios Ayllón (1632-1677), layperson of the archdiocese of Lima; married (Peru)
 Servant of God Nicolasa Castillo Negrón (1894-1965), professed religious, Franciscan Religious Sisters of the Immaculate Conception of Mary (Peru)
 Servant of God Alejandro Labaka Ugarte (1920-1987), apostolic vicar of Aguarico (Ecuador)
 Servant of God Inés Arango Velásquez (1937-1987), professed religious, Tertiary Capuchin Sisters of the Holy Family (Ecuador)
 Servant of God José María Yerovi Pintado (1819-1867), bishop of Quito (Ecuador)
 Servant of God José Ignacio Checa y Barba (1829-1877), archbishop of Quito; Martyr (Ecuador)
 Servant of God Francisco De Jesús Bolaños Rosero (1701-1785), professed priest, Mercedarians (Ecuador)
 Servant of God Angela Elena Muñoz Moral (1890-1911), young layperson of the diocese of Latacunga (Ecuador)
 Servant of God Rafael Armando Fajardo Rodríguez (1871-1942), priest of the diocese of Azogues (Ecuador)
 Servant of God José Antonio Sarasola Uruláin (1907-1988), professed priest, Capuchin Franciscans (Ecuador)
 Servant of God Julio Tobar Donoso (1894-1981), layperson of the archdiocese of Quito; married (Ecuador)
 Servant of God Juan María Riera Moscoso (1866-1915), bishop of Guayaquil (Ecuador)
 Servant of God Carlos Crespi Croci (1891-1982), professed priest, Salesians of Don Bosco (Ecuador),
 Servant of God Alberto Ferri Garavelli (1935-2009), professed priest, Comboni Missionaries of the Heart of Jesus (Ecuador),
 Servant of God Pedro Manuel Salado De Alba (1968-2012), professed religious, Ecclesial Family «Hogar de Nazaret» (Ecuador),

Candidates for sainthood
Others have been proposed for beatification, and may have active groups supporting their causes. These include:

 Gabriel García Moreno (1821–1875), layman and President (Ecuador)
 Eugenio Biffi (1829–1896) priest of the Pontifical Institute for Foreign Missions; bishop of Cartagena (Colombia)
 Clemente Díaz Rodríguez (1848–1905), priest of the diocese of San Bernardo; founder of the Sisters of Mercy of Maipo (Chile)
 Argentino del Valle Larrabure (1932–1975) married layperson and military officer; Martyr (Argentina)
 Luís Espinal Camps (1932–1980), spanish Jesuit priest and activist; Martyr (Bolivia)
 Nicolás Pakarati Urepotahi (1860-1927) and Elizabet Rangitaki Temaki Urepotahi (1869-1949), Married Laypersons from the Diocese of Villarrica; Catechists (Chile)
 Omayra Sánchez (1972–1982), young layperson of the diocese of Líbano–Honda (Colombia)
 Roque Jacinto Solaque (1968–1996) layperson, mystic and stigmatized (Colombia)
 María de la Cruz Morínigo (1931–1996), married layperson of the diocese of Posadas and activist (Argentina and Paraguay)
 Pocho Lepratti (1966–2001) layperson and school teacher; Martyr (Argentina)
 Isaías Duarte Cancino (1939–2002), archbishop of Cali; Martyr (Colombia)
 Nínawa Daher (1979–2011), layperson of the Maronite Catholic Eparchy of San Charbel in Buenos Aires  (Argentina)
 Cecilia Maria of the Holy Face (1973–2016), Professed Religious  of the Discalced Carmelite Nuns (Argentina)
 José María Masià Vidiella (1815-1902) professed priest, Franciscan Friars Minor, bishop of Loja (Peru), (Ecuador)
 Antonio Porturas Plaza (1922-1988) professed priest, Franciscan Friars Minor (Peru)
 Vicente Hondarza Gómez (1935-1983), priest of the Spanish Foreign Mission Institute (Peru)
 Irene Mccormack (1938-1991), professed religious, Sisters of Saint Joseph of the Sacred Heart of Jesus (Peru)
 Giulio Rocca (1962-1992), layperson of the diocese of Como (Peru)
 Bernardo Calle González (1876-1904), professed priest, Augustinians (Peru)
 Manuel García Marina (1892-1926), professed religious, Dominicans (Peru)
 José Arnaldo Alba (1892-1937), professed priest, Dominicans (Peru)
 Joan Sawyer (1932-1983), professed religious, Sisters of Saint Columban (Peru)
 Carlos Riudavets Montes (1945-2018), professed priest, Jesuits (Peru)
 Paul McAuley (1947-2019), professed religious, De La Salle Brothers (Peru)
 Aldo Menghi (1944-1995), professed religious, Congregation of the Schools of Charity, Cavanis Institute (Ecuador)
 Mirosław Józef Karczewski (1965-2001), professed priest, Conventual Franciscans (Ecuador)
 Víctor Betancourt Ruiz (1966-2008), professed priest, Jesuits (Ecuador)

See also
List of Central American and Caribbean Saints
List of Brazilian Saints
List of Mexican saints
List of saints of the Canary Islands

References

Other references
 
 
"Hagiography Circle"

Catholic Church in South America
Lists of saints by place